Il giorno prima (internationally released as Control and Mind Control) is a 1987 Italian drama film directed by Giuliano Montaldo and starring Burt Lancaster and Ben Gazzara. The story was written by Piero Angela and the screenplay was by Piero Angela, Jeremy Hole, Giuliano Montaldo and Brian Moore.

Plot 
This story takes place during an experiment concerning psychological effects of mental fatigue on those locked in a fallout shelter for a long period of time. Twelve subjects are locked in a nuclear fallout shelter to see how long they can endure before mental breakdown occurs. After the experiment Dr. Herbert Monroe (Burt Lancaster) tells the world about this terrifying experiment and its outcome.

Cast

References

Sources
The Motion Picture Guide 1988 Annual: The Films of 1987

1987 films
1987 drama films
English-language Italian films
Films scored by Ennio Morricone
Films directed by Giuliano Montaldo
Films based on Irish novels
Works by Brian Moore (novelist)
Italian drama films
1980s English-language films
1980s Italian films
Films set in bunkers